Bartolommeo Ligozzi was a 17th-century Italian painter who specialized in still-life paintings of flowers and genre subjects. He was the nephew of Jacopo Ligozzi. Born in Verona, Ligozzi flourished at Florence around the year 1620. He died at the age of 76.

References

Sources

Italian Baroque painters
Italian still life painters
17th-century Italian painters
Italian male painters
Painters from Florence